The 24th Australian Film Institute Awards (generally known as the AFI Awards) were held at the Capitol Theatre in Sydney on 27 October 1982.  Presented by the Australian Film Institute (AFI), the awards celebrated the best in Australian feature film, documentary and short film productions of 1982.

Thirty feature films were entered, then a record number.  Lonely Hearts received the award for Best Film.  Although Mad Max 2 received the most nominations and awards including for Best Achievement in Direction, it was not nominated for Best Film.  Animator Eric Porter received the Raymond Longford Award for lifetime achievement.

Winners and nominees
Winners are listed first and highlighted in boldface.

Feature film

Jury awards

References

External links
 The Australian Film Institute | Australian Academy of Cinema and Television Arts official website

AACTA Awards ceremonies
AACTA Awards
1982 in Australian cinema